A Regra do Jogo (English title: Rules of The Game) is a Brazilian primetime telenovela, created by João Emanuel Carneiro for TV Globo. It premiered on August 31, 2015 at 9 pm timeslot.

Written by João Emanuel Carneiro, internationally recognized by the success of Avenida Brasil one of the most popular and profitable telenovela of recent times. A Regra do Jogo debut had high expectations, mainly after succeeding Babilônia, which suffered great rejection of the public and is already considered one of the lowest rated telenovelas for the primetime timeslot.

The main cast entails; Alexandre Nero, Giovanna Antonelli, Vanessa Giacomo, Cauã Reymond, Eduardo Moscovis, Marco Pigossi, Susana Vieira, Tony Ramos and Cássia Kis.

According to IBOPE, in the week of September 28 to October 4, 2015, A Regra do Jogo was the most watched program of the Brazilian television, with an average of 8,013,730 viewers per minute, taking into account a projection of 15 metropolitan areas.

In 2016, the telenovela obtained two nominations to the International Emmy Award in the categories Best Telenovela and best Actor for Alexandre Nero.

Plot 
Romero Rômulo (Alexandre Nero) is a hero of the people. For others, he is just a selfish crook. He heads an institution that bestows former convicts into society. Little does anyone know that it is also a way of recruiting criminals for the clique he belongs to and through which he earns good money through several robberies and scams. His lover Atena (Giovanna Antonelli), is a swindler who misses no chances. Unprincipled and immoral, she only wants to take advantage of Romero. But deep down, she hides true feelings for him.

One of Romero's mortal enemies is his stepfather, Zé Maria (Tony Ramos), whom he accused in the past of killing twenty people during a massacre inside a bus. Djanira (Cássia Kiss) has never forgiven her son Romero for the testimony, because the love of her life had to become a fugitive from justice. Besides, she had to raise her stepson, the former wrestler Juliano (Cauã Reymond), and her adopted daughter, the virtuous Toia (Vanessa Giácomo) by herself. They grew up together and soon started dating, but Juliano's desire for revenge keeps getting in the way of the couple's romance. Juliano is released on probation for suspected drug trafficking whereas he also seeks for justice and intends to prove his father's innocence, pointing all the blame to the dangerous syndicate.

Cast

Ratings

Awards and nominations

International release
"The Rules of the Game" will be launched on the international market in fall 2016; Globo has already started international pre-sales.

Soundtrack
 Photo: Giovanna Antonelli as Atena

References

External links
  
 

2015 telenovelas
Brazilian telenovelas
TV Globo telenovelas
2015 Brazilian television series debuts
2016 Brazilian television series endings
Brazilian LGBT-related television shows
Lesbian-related television shows
Portuguese-language telenovelas
Television shows set in Rio de Janeiro (city)